John Baddyng (fl.1382–1401), of Rye, Sussex, was an English Member of Parliament.

Baddyng was probably the son of the Rye MP, Richard Baddyng, and Joan Baddyng née Rosse, also of Rye. It is thought that John Baddyng had one son.

He was a Member (MP) of the Parliament of England for Rye in 1386, 1393, 1395, 1399, 1402 and 1407.He was Mayor of Rye August 1390–1, 1393-4 and 1395–7.

References

14th-century births
15th-century deaths
14th-century English people
15th-century English people
People from Rye, East Sussex
Mayors of Rye, East Sussex
Members of the Parliament of England (pre-1707)